Yuriy  Mykhailovych Kotsiubynsky (December 7, 1896 – March 8, 1937) was a Bolshevik politician, activist, member of the Soviet government in Ukraine, one of the co-founders of Red Cossacks Army of Ukrainian Republic.

Before the Revolution
Yuriy, like his father Mykhailo Kotsiubynsky, was born in Vinnytsia, Podolia Governorate. He studied in the Chernihiv Gymnasium. In 1913, Yuriy joined the Bolsheviks and in 1916 was mobilized to the Russian Imperial Army. Later he studied in school of praporshchiks in Odessa and serving in Petrograd. In the capital Kotsiubynsky led an anti-war agitation among soldiers for which he was arrested on several occasions by the Provisional Government. There he also became a member of a military organization at the Petrograd Committee of Russian Social Democratic Labour Party (Bolshevik), a commissar of Semenovsky Guard Reserve Regiment, the Chief of Red Guard and commandant of the Moscow-Narva region (Petrograd).

After the Revolution
With his future brother-in-law Vitaly Primakov Kotsiubynsky took active participation in storming of the Winter Palace during the October Revolution. Later he headed the Red Guard detachment of Moscow-Narva Distinct (Saint-Petersburg) against the forces of Kerensky - Krasnov, being also the commandant of the mentioned district. In December 1917 he became a deputy of People's Secretary of Military Affairs and later was acting as the Secretary. In January 1918 he became the Chief of Staff of the Soviet Ukrainian People's Republic and chairman of military collegiate, nominally heading the army of the Petrograd Red Guards and Baltic Sailors in the fight against the national forces of the Ukrainian People's Republic occupying Kyiv in February 1918. In reality the army was led by Muraviov who was subordinated to Vladimir Antonov-Ovseyenko.

In March 1918 Kotsiubynsky was elected to the Central Executive Committee (a.k.a. Tsikuka) and also was appointed as the People's Secretary of Internal Affairs. In July 1918 Kotsyubysnky joined the All Ukrainian Central Military revkom. Since November 1918 became a member of the reinstated Ukrainian Bolshevik government, the Provisional Workers-Peasants Government of Ukraine. During 1919-1920 Kotsiubynsky headed several regional party offices in Chernihiv and Poltava. From April to November 1919 he was a chairman of the Chernigov Governorate executive committee (governor). Since 1920 he held diplomatic missions to Austria and Poland until 1930. In 1922-23 he was an auditor of Marxist courses at the Socialist Academy. In 1930 Kotsiubynsky became the deputy of head of Derzhplan; however in September 1933 he occupied the chair of Derzhplan and became the deputy chairman of the Ukrainian sovnarkom (Vice Prime Minister). During these last several years he was a member of the Central Committee of the Communist Party (Bolsheviks) of Ukraine and the All-Ukrainian Central Executive Committee.

Arrest
In November 1934, Kotsiubynsky was fired from his job losing his membership in the Central Committee. In February 1935, he was arrested while being charged with anti-Soviet activities and convicted by the decision of the Special Board of NKVD to six years of exile in Almaty. In March 1935 he was excluded from the Party. In October 1936 Kotsiubynsky was arrested again while in exile and transferred to Kyiv. There, together with Vasyl Poraiko, Holubenko, Tytar, Tyrchuk, Volodymyr Lohinov and Pleskachevsky, he was charged with directing activities of a secret Trotskist center in Ukraine (Ukrainian Trotskyite Opposition) at the behest of Georgy Pyatakov.

On March 8, 1937 he was convicted by the Collegiate of the Soviet Supreme Court and executed by firing squad later the same day. In December 1955 he was rehabilitated.

There exist the Letter without envelope to Kotsiubynsky from Serhiy Okhrymenko in which the Ukrainian scientist blames him in bloody crimes against his own people.

(Pavlo Khrystiuk, Ukrainian historian)

References

External links
Handbook on history of the Communist Party
Small Dictionary of history of Ukraine
Profile at personalities
Yu.Kotsyubynsky on the service at the Red commissars

1896 births
1937 deaths
Politicians from Vinnytsia
People from Vinnitsky Uyezd
Russian military personnel of World War I
Ukrainian people of World War I
Old Bolsheviks
Russian Social Democratic Labour Party members
Communist Party of Ukraine (Soviet Union) politicians
Soviet defence ministers of Ukraine
Soviet interior ministers of Ukraine
Directors of the State Planning Committee of the Ukrainian Soviet Socialist Republic
Ambassadors of Ukraine to Austria
Great Purge victims from Ukraine
Ukrainian revolutionaries
Russian people of Ukrainian descent
Soviet people of the Ukrainian–Soviet War